Norddal or Dalsbygda is a village in Fjord Municipality in Møre og Romsdal county, Norway. The village is located in a valley with steep mountains on each side, on the southern shore of the Norddalsfjorden.

Norddal is home to Norddal Church and some 150 permanent residents. The only access to the village by road is through the nearby village of Eidsdal. The famous Geiranger area is connected to Norddal by hiking trails over the mountain pass to the south of the village.

References

Villages in Møre og Romsdal
Fjord (municipality)